Heshang Moheyan was a late 8th century Buddhist monk associated with the East Mountain Teaching. Moheyan (摩訶衍) is a brief translation of Mahayana in Chinese, so the name literally means a Mahayana monk. He became famous for representing Chan Buddhism in the so called "Council of Lhasa," a debate between adherents of the Indian teachings of "gradual enlightenment" and the Chinese teachings of "sudden enlightenment," which according to tradition was won by the "gradual teachings."

Etymology
Hvashang is a Tibetan approximation of the Chinese héshàng "Buddhist monk. This, in turn, comes from the Sanskrit title upādhyāya "teacher".

Biography

Dunhuang sojourn
Whilst the East Mountain Teachings (known as the "Northern School" Chan) were in decline, having been attacked by Shenhui (a student of Huineng) as a supposed "gradual enlightenment" teaching, Moheyan  traveled to Dunhuang, which at the time belonged to the Tibetan Empire, in 781 or 787. For Moheyan, this was a new opportunity for the spread of (Northern) Chan.

Council of Lhasa

After teaching in the area of Dunhuang, Moheyan was invited by Trisong Detsen of the Tibetan Empire to settle at Samye, then the center of emerging Tibetan Buddhism. Moheyan promulgated a variety of Chan Buddhism and disseminated teachings from Samye where he attracted a considerable number of followers.

However, in 793 Trisong Detsen resolved that Moheyan did not hold the true Dharma. Following intense protests from Moheyan’s supporters, Trisong Detsen proposed to settle the matter by sponsoring a debate. The most famous of these debates has become known as the "Council of Lhasa", although it may have taken place at Samye, a considerable distance from Lhasa. For the famed Council of Lhasa, an Indian monk named Kamalaśīla was invited to represent Indian Buddhism, while Moheyan represented Chinese Chan Buddhism.

While Moheyan took a subitist approach to enlightenment. In this view, practices such as the perfection of morality, and studying Buddhist texts was seen as "gradualist", and Moheyan held that these were only necessary for those of "dim" facility and "dull" propensity. Those of "sharp" and "keen" facility and propensity do not need these practices, as they have "direct" access to the truth through meditation. This concession to the "gradualists", that not everyone can achieve the highest state of meditation, left Moheyan open to the charge that he had a dualistic approach to practice. To overcome these inconsistencies in his thesis, Moheyan claimed that when one gave up all conceptions, an automatic, all-at-once attainment of virtue resulted. He taught that there was an "internal" practice to gain insight and liberate one-self, and an "external" practice to liberate others (upaya, or skillful means). These were seen as two independent practices, a concession to human psychology and scriptural tradition.

According to José Cabezón:In the so-called “Great Debate” that the sources tell us took place at the then newly founded monastery of Bsam yas between 792 and 794 c.e., the renowned Indian scholar Kamalaśīla is supposed to have debated the Chinese Ch’an master, Hwa shang Mahayana. The Tibetan sources tell us that the debate (shags) took place before the emperor. Kamalaśīla was the advocate of a “gradualist” (rim gyis pa) position, the view that enlightenment is attained through the incremental purification of the mind that takes place by the practice of the six perfections. This path, he held, requires analytical mental activity and a commitment to the intentional accumulation of merit. Hwa shang held the “simultaneist” (cig car ba) view—that (for advanced adepts at least) enlightenment is not attained gradually through the purification of the mind, that for these individuals analytical activity is a distraction and the accumulation of merit unnecessary. Instead, he claimed, enlightenment, as something that is already immanent in the individual, can immediately be accessed by directing the mind internally, by ceasing mentation, and by becoming aware of the nature of mind itself. Most of the Tibetan accounts tell us that Kamalashila won the debate, and this is said to have sealed the fate of Tibetan Buddhism forever. King Khri srong lde’u btsan, who served as “arbiter” or “judge” (dpang po) in the debate, declared that henceforth Tibetans would follow the Indian Buddhist tradition, in particular the system of Nagarjuna.Most Tibetan sources state that the debate was decided in Kamalaśīla's favour (though many Chinese sources claim Moheyan won) and Moheyan was required to leave the country and that all sudden-enlightenment texts were gathered and destroyed by royal decree. This was a pivotal event in the history of Tibetan Buddhism, which would afterward continue to follow the late Indian model with only minor influence from China.

Nevertheless, Chan texts were produced until the 10th century in Tibet, which casts doubt on these Tibetan sources.

Teachings

Sudden teachings

Moheyan’s teachings were a mixture of the East Mountain Teachings associated with Yuquan Shenxiu  and Baotang Chan. Broughton gives the following nomenclature:

The dichotomy of the gradual north and sudden south is a historical construction, as both Northern and Southern Schools contained "gradualist teachings" and "sudden teachings" and practices.

Liberation from vikalpa-citta
Gōmez gives a detailed account of the doctrinary differences that were at stake at the "council of Lhasa", based on Buton Rinchen Drub's Chos-'yun, which in turn may have been based on Kamalaśīla's Third Bhāvanākrama. Buton Rinchen Drub had chosen two points to summarize the conflict, which entails complex doctrinal and historical issues.

Most of what is known of Moheyan’s teaching comes from fragments of writings in Chinese and Tibetan found in the Mogao Caves of Dunhuang (now in Gansu, China). The manuscript given the appellation IOL Tib J 709 is a collection of nine Chan texts, commencing with the teachings of Moheyan.

According to Buton Rinchen Drub, the conflict centered around two theses set out by Moheyan:
 "As long as one carries out good or evil acts, one is not free from transmigration."
 "Whoever does not think of anything, whoever does not reflect, will be totally free from transmigration. Not thinking, not pondering, non-examination, non-apprehension of an object - this is the immediate access [to liberation]."

yet, a principal point of Moheyan's teaching is that according to Moheyan, the root cause of samsara is the creation of false distinctions, vikalpa-citta. As long as these false distinctions are being created, one is bound to samsara.

Good and evil acts
According to Buton Rinchen Drub, Moheyan taught that carrying out good or evil acts binds one to transmigration. Moheyan's point is that the concept of good or false is itself still conceptual thinking, which obscures enlightenment. If all thought, good or bad, obscures enlightenment, then all actions must be based on the simplest principles of conduct. To achieve proper conduct, all conceptions, without exception should be seen as false:

Not-thinking
Sam van Schaik notes that Moheyan "didn’t advocate the suppression of thoughts," but rather advised, in his own words:

By practicing dhyana, awareness should be reverted toward this awareness itself:

By turning the attention inward, one discovers that no "self-nature" can be found in the movements of the mind. Eventually, dhyana leads to the realisation that awareness is empty, and cannot be grasped by concepts:

Influence
The teachings of Moheyan and other Chan masters were unified with the Kham Dzogchen ("Great Perfection") lineages through the Kunkhyen (Tibetan for "omniscient"), Rongzom Chokyi Zangpo. The Dzogchen of the Nyingma was often identified with the subitist ("sudden enlightenment") of Moheyan, and was called to defend itself against this charge by avowed members of the Sarma lineages that held to the staunch view of "gradual enlightenment"

Iconography
According to Ying Chua, Moheyan is often iconographically depicted holding a shankha (Sanskrit) and a mala (Sanskrit):

An iconographic thangka depiction of Moheyan is held in the Southern Alleghenies Museum of Art (SAMA) collection, St. Francis College, Loretto, Pennsylvania.

See also
 Chöd

Notes

References

Sources

Printed sources

Web-sources

External links
 Moheyan (undated). 
 Moheyan (undated). 
 Sam van Schaik (2008), Tibetan Chan II: the teachings of Heshang Moheyan
 Sam van Schaik (2008, Tibetan Chan III: more teachings of Heshang Moheyan
 Vladimir K., On Thoughts in Zazen

Tang dynasty Buddhist monks
Chan Buddhist monks
Rangtong-Shentong